The 2014 Coastal Carolina Chanticleers football team represented Coastal Carolina University in the 2014 NCAA Division I FCS football season. They were led by third-year head coach Joe Moglia and played their home games at Brooks Stadium. They were a member of the Big South Conference. They finished the season 12–2, 4–1 in Big South play to share the conference championship with Liberty. They received an at-large bid to the FCS Playoffs where they defeated Richmond in the first round before losing in the quarterfinals to North Dakota State.

Schedule

Source: Schedule

Ranking movements

References

Coastal Carolina
Coastal Carolina Chanticleers football seasons
Big South Conference football champion seasons
Coastal Carolina
Coastal Carolina Chanticleers football